Andres Schneiter (born 8 April 1976) is a former professional tennis player from Argentina and works as a coach on ATP tour. His career-high ATP Entry singles ranking was No. 219 in 1998 and No. 62 in doubles in 2003.

Playing career
On the futures tour, Schneiter won four singles titles, three on clay and the other on carpet.

He was a doubles specialist who won two doubles titles with Sergio Roitman at Amsterdam in 2000 and at Umag in 2001. Schneiter was a runner up at Bucharest in 2002 with Emilio Benfele Álvarez. His best Grand Slam doubles result was reaching the third round of the French Open with Sergio Roitman. Schneiter retired in 2004.

Coaching career
Schneiter was the former coach of Mariano Puerta and was his coach when Puerta reached the 2005 French Open final, where Puerta tested positive for drugs.

He later coached Cristian Garín to four ATP titles whom he is currently coaching together with Juan Ignacio Londero, Federico Coria and Emilio Gómez.

ATP career finals

Doubles: 3 (2 titles, 1 runner-up)

ATP Challenger and ITF Futures finals

Singles: 4 (4–0)

Doubles: 29 (14–15)

Performance timelines

Doubles

References

External links
 
 

Argentine male tennis players
Argentine people of German descent
Tennis players from Buenos Aires
1976 births
Living people